The 2012 French motorcycle Grand Prix was the fourth round of the 2012 Grand Prix motorcycle racing season. It took place on the weekend of 18–20 May 2012 at the Bugatti Circuit in Le Mans, France. In a press conference on the Thursday before the race, Casey Stoner announced his retirement from the sport at the end of the season. He went on to finish third in the MotoGP race, handing the championship lead to Jorge Lorenzo, the race winner. Valentino Rossi took second place for his first podium since the previous year's race. Thomas Lüthi and Louis Rossi won the Moto2 and Moto3 races respectively. This was the 800th race to contribute to the Grand Prix motorcycle racing championship.

Classification

MotoGP

Moto2

Moto3

Championship standings after the race (MotoGP)
Below are the standings for the top five riders and constructors after round four has concluded.

Riders' Championship standings

Constructors' Championship standings

 Note: Only the top five positions are included for both sets of standings.

References

French motorcycle Grand Prix
French
Motorcycle Grand Prix
French motorcycle Grand Prix